Stictotarsus is a genus of beetles in the family Dytiscidae.

Species include:

 Stictotarsus aequinoctialis (Clark, 1862)
 Stictotarsus alpestris Dutton & Angus, 2007
 Stictotarsus bertrandi (Legros, 1956)
 Stictotarsus coelamboides (Fall, 1923)
 Stictotarsus corvinus (Sharp, 1887)
 Stictotarsus creticus Dutton & Angus, 2007
 Stictotarsus decemsignatus (Clark, 1862)
 Stictotarsus deceptus (Fall, 1932)
 Stictotarsus dolerosus (Leech, 1945)
 Stictotarsus duodecimpustulatus (Fabricius, 1792)
 Stictotarsus emmerichi (Falkenström, 1936)
 Stictotarsus eximius (Motschulsky, 1859)
 Stictotarsus expositus (Fall, 1923)
 Stictotarsus falli Nilsson, 2001
 Stictotarsus funereus (Crotch, 1873)
 Stictotarsus grammicus (Sharp, 1887)
 Stictotarsus griseostriatus (De Geer, 1774)
 Stictotarsus ibericus Dutton & Angus, 2007
 Stictotarsus inexpectatus Dutton & Angus, 2007
 Stictotarsus interjectus (Sharp, 1882)
 Stictotarsus macedonicus (Guéorguiev, 1959)
 Stictotarsus maghrebinus Mazzoldi & Toledo, 1998
 Stictotarsus minax (Zimmerman, 1982)
 Stictotarsus minipi (Larson, 1991)
 Stictotarsus multilineatus (Falkenström, 1922)
 Stictotarsus neomexicanus (Zimmerman & A.H.Smith, 1975)
 Stictotarsus opaculus (Sharp, 1882)
 Stictotarsus panaminti (Fall, 1923)
 Stictotarsus procerus (Aubé, 1838)
 Stictotarsus riberae Dutton & Angus, 2007
 Stictotarsus roffii (Clark, 1862)
 Stictotarsus spectabilis (Zimmerman, 1982)
 Stictotarsus spenceri (Leech, 1945)
 Stictotarsus striatellus (LeConte, 1852)
 Stictotarsus titulus (Leech, 1945)

References

Dytiscidae